Resler v. Shehee, 5 U.S. (1 Cranch) 110 (1801), was a United States Supreme Court case that involved judicial discretion on whether to hear appeals filed late.

Background 
Around the start of the 19th century, courts typically met in sessions.  Appeals had to be filled in the current session or the next session after the original judgment.  The courts in Virginia often heard appeals that were filed out of time.  A Court of Hustings in Alexandria, Virginia heard a complaint on February 2, 1801.  At that time, the laws of Virginia held that the appeal should be heard on April 6, 1801.  Before the appeal could be heard, The United States Congress passed an act on February 29, 1801 creating the District of Columbia and its new Circuit Court.  Two terms later, Resler appealed to the new Circuit Court and his appeal was denied on the grounds that it was late.  He appealed to the Supreme Court on the grounds that the Virginia appellate courts would have heard the claim.

Opinion of the Court 
The decision of the court is sufficiently short as to merit its inclusion here in totality:

Thus the appeal was dismissed.

See also
 List of United States Supreme Court cases, volume 5
Statute of Limitations
History of Washington, D.C.

Notes and references

External links
 

United States Supreme Court cases
United States Supreme Court cases of the Marshall Court
1801 in United States case law